Lieutenant-General Coote Synge-Hutchinson (7 August 1832 – 13 February 1902) was a British Army officer.

Military career

He was born in Dublin, Ireland, the son of Francis Synge-Hutchinson and Lady Louisa Frances Synge-Hutchinson, daughter of Hon. Francis Hely-Hutchinson and sister of the Earl of Donoughmore.

Synge-Hutchinson, of the 2nd Dragoon Guards, was awarded the Indian Mutiny Medal, with Lucknow clasp, for service with the 2nd Dragoon Guards (Queen's Bays).

He was later promoted to Lieutenant General and became Honorary Colonel of the 19th Royal Hussars from 24 March 1899 to 13 February 1902.

His nephew was Colonel Edward Douglas Brown VC.

In 1888, at the age of 56, he married Emily Charlotte Jecks. Together they raised a daughter, Haidee. However, as they were not married at the time of her birth, her birth was registered under her mother's previous husband's surname. In 2007 Coote Synge-Hutchinson's descendants sold his Indian Mutiny Medal and a VC Ribbon Bar which had been awarded to his nephew Edward Douglas Brown at auction. Together the pieces brought in £2,128.

References

2nd Dragoon Guards (Queen's Bays) officers
1832 births
1902 deaths
Burials at Brompton Cemetery
British military personnel of the Indian Rebellion of 1857
Military personnel from Dublin (city)